Iliyan is a Persian and Bulgarian form of the male Hebrew name Eliyahu (Elijah), meaning "My God is Yahu/Jah." It comes from the Byzantine Greek pronunciation of the vocative (Ilía) of the Greek Elias (Ηλίας, Ilías).

People 
Iliyan Stefanov, (Bulgarian: Илиян Стефанов; born 20 September 1998) is a Bulgarian footballer
Iliyan Mitsanski, (Bulgarian: Илиян Мицански; born 20 December 1985) is a Bulgarian professional footballer who plays as a striker
Iliyan Boyden, Grandson of Agha Khan IV

See also 
Ilija (given name)
Ilias (name)

References 

Persian masculine given names
Bulgarian masculine given names